The sixteenth Gyalwa Karmapa, Rangjung Rigpe Dorje (August 14, 1924 – November 5, 1981) was the spiritual leader of the Karma Kagyu lineage of Tibetan Buddhism. Followers believed him to be part of the oldest line of reincarnate lamas in Vajrayana Buddhism, known as the Karmapas, whose coming was predicted by the Buddha in the Samadhiraja Sutra. The 16th Karmapa was considered to be a "living Buddha" and was deeply involved in the transmission of the Vajrayana Buddhism to Europe and North America following the Chinese invasion of Tibet. He had many monikers, including “King of the Yogis”, and is the subject of numerous books and films.

Biography

Birth
The 16th Karmapa was born in Denkhok in the Dergé province in Eastern Tibet, Kham, near the Dri Chu or Yangtze River. The previous Karmapa Khakhyab Dorje (1871-1922) left a letter setting forth the circumstances of his next incarnation. The Karmapa's attendant, Jampal Tsultrim, possessed the letter of prediction, which matched exactly with the proceeding the 11th Tai Situpa was already undertaking to find the 16th Karmapa Rangjung Rigpe Dorje.

Controversy and Recognition as Karmapa
As with previous and future Karmapas political obstacles arose in the recognition of the 16th Karmapa.

Before the letter from Jampal Tsultrim could arrive to the 13th Dalai Lama's Gelugpa controlled government in Lhasa, the Ministry of Religion issued a formal statement that the Karmapa’s reincarnation had been born as the son of one of the cabinet ministers, Lungshawa, in Lhasa. Lungshawa wanted his son to be named as the Karmapa as part of his plan to modernize Tibet. The Karmapa's labrang (the Tsurphu monastery administration) appealed the decision saying that they had an authentic prediction letter, however, the central government replied that the Dalai Lama had issued a position, which couldn't be changed. The petitioning went back and forth for a year until Lungshawa's son fell from a roof, broke his pelvis and died from ensuing complications. The Tsurphu monastery re-submitted their Karmapa candidate but were again rebuffed by the central government—submitting a single candidate was equivalent to the Tsurphu monastery choosing the candidate. The first Beru Khyentse Rinpoche came up with a plan to submit the same candidate—one name as the son of the father and the "other" the name as the son of the mother. The central government responded by saying the correct tulku was the mother's son, not the father's son.

Early life and first Black Crown Ceremony
He was taken to the Palpung Monastery where the 11th Tai Situpa, Pema Wangchok, gave him ordination, the Bodhisattva vows and many teachings. Beru Khyentse Lodro Miza Pampa'i Gocha taught him the tantras. Bo Kangkar Rinpoche taught him the sutras. Jamgon Palden Kyentse Oser taught him Mahamudra and the Six Yogas of Naropa. He regarded the 11th Tai Situpa, Pema Wangchok, and the 2nd Jamgön Kongtrül Khyentse Öser as his root gurus. In 1931, at the age of seven, he performed his first Black Crown ceremony. He received his hair cutting ceremony at age thirteen from Thubten Gyatso, 13th Dalai Lama.

Education and Receiving Important Transmissions
During his education, he received all the Kagyu transmissions and was also taught by the Sakya Trizin for many years. In the beginning of 1940, he went into retreat, and in 1947, started a pilgrimage to India together with Tenzin Gyatso, the 14th Dalai Lama. Rangjung continued his education with the 10th Mindrolling Trichen of the Nyingma School and it was concluded with the Kalachakra initiation of the Gelugpa School. Rangjung had therefore received all the major teachings of all the major Tibetan Buddhist schools.

Teaching Activity
The 16th Karmapa continued his predecessor's activities, travelling and teaching throughout Tibet, Bhutan, Nepal, Sikkim, India and parts of China. His activity also included locating the rebirths of high reincarnate lamas spontaneously, without meditation.

Premonitions of Chinese Occupation and Escape from Tibet

Prior to the Chinese invasion of Tibet the Karmapa made a series of predictions indicating that the Tibetan people would need to be prepared to escape to India. In 1940, at age 16, Karmapa composed a poem that predicted the occupation of Tibet.:

As political circumstances altered Tibet radically with the 1950 takeover by China. The Karmapa, along with the Dalai Lama, government officials, and other high lamas, attended talks in Beijing to negotiate a settlement. This succeeded for a while, but in 1959 the Chinese government insisted on land reform, which would undermine the system of independent monasteries in Tibetan Buddhism. Conflict with the lamas as spiritual leaders accelerated.

In February of that year Karmapa took 160 students from Tsurphu Monastery and escaped to Bhutan, taking the lineage's most sacred treasures and relics with them.

Tashi Namgyal, the King of Sikkim, offered the Karmapa the site where the 9th Karmapa had previously established one of three Sikkim monasteries, which was then in ruins. It was here that the 16th Karmapa's seat-in-exile, Rumtek Monastery, was built then officially inaugurated in 1966. The traditional Tibetan seat of the Karmapa, Tsurphu Monastery, from where the Karmapa Ogyen Trinley Dorje escaped in 1999, still exists while the number of monks is restricted by the Chinese government.

Focus on the West
In the beginning of the 1970s the Karmapa made the prediction  that Tibet would have a hard struggle gaining independence and even if it did, it would not allow the refugees to return. Rumtek would not be a good place either, and although Sikkim and Bhutan are still stable, they can deteriorate as well. However the Western world will embrace Buddhism, so he sent Lama Gendün to Europe.

In 1974, with the help of Freda Bedi, he embarked on his first world tour. On September 15, The Karmapa left Rumtek with an entourage of Tulkus and monks, including Tenga Rinpoche, Bardor Tulku Rinpoche and Lama Jigme Rinpoche. He was welcomed in London September 17, by Chime Rinpoche, Akong Rinpoche and others, including Hannah Nydahl and Lama Ole Nydahl. The Karmapa traveled to Europe, Canada and the United States, where he was welcomed by Chögyam Trungpa. In October of 1974 The Karmapa visited the Second Mesa, Hopi reservation in Arizona. He established Dhagpo Kagyu Ling in France as the central seat of activity, gave several Black Crown ceremonies, and attended an audience granted by Pope Paul VI. In 1976-77 he began a more exhaustive tour, giving extensive teachings, visiting nearly every major city in Europe.

In May 1980, Karmapa again visited the West, stopping for lectures and ceremonies in London, New York, San Francisco, Boulder, and Santa Fe.

The sixteenth Karmapa helped foster the transmission of Tibetan Buddhism to the West. He established Dharma centers and monasteries in various places around the world in order to protect, preserve, and spread Buddha's teachings. As part of an initiative by the Tibetan government-in-exile to consolidate the organizations of Tibetan Buddhism, Rangjung Rigpe Dorje became the first formal head of the Kagyu School, although the earlier Karmapas had long been considered the most prestigious and authoritative lamas of that school.

Miracles
There are several accounts of miracles performed by the 16th Karmapa, which is in keeping with many Buddhist masters that came before him.

Childhood
The Karmapa's identity as a child was kept secret, but nearby villagers noticed auspicious signs at his birth and came to him for blessings. As a child the Karmapa exhibited clairvoyant abilities, and if local peasants lost a sheep or another animal from their flock he knew where their animals were.

Birds
Karmapa, who was fond of birds, was said to bless them upon their death. Instead of keeling over they would remain completely stiff and remain upwards for several days. It was understood that the birds were in a state of samadhi, and this process was known as "liberation through contact".

Hopi tribe and relieving drought

In 1974 the Karmapa visited the Hopi tribe in New Mexico, who had requested him to relieve their drought-stricken land. He conducted a ceremony, and a deluge of rain fell for the first time in seventy-five days. In the evening, Hopi and Navajo people were granted the empowerment of 
Red Chenrezig.

Death
In 1980-81 the Karmapa began his last world tour, giving teachings, interviews and empowerments in South East Asia, Greece, Great Britain, Canada and the United States. Rangjung Rigpei Dorjé died on November 5, 1981 in the United States in a hospital in Zion, Illinois, just north of Chicago. Doctors and nurses at the hospital remarked on his kindness and how he seemed more concerned with their welfare than his own.

According to buddhism-affiliated sources, one doctor was also struck by the Karmapa's refusal of pain medication and the absence of any signs of feeling the profound pain that most patients in his condition report. Upon his death, against hospital procedure but in keeping with Tibetan tradition and with special permission from the State of Illinois, his body was left in the hospital for three days.

His body was cremated at Rumtek, also according to Tibetan tradition.

Legacy
Like his predecessors, he was primarily a spiritual figure and therefore not involved in politics. He instead made efforts to keep the spiritual traditions of Tibet intact and in this way helped to preserve the identity of Tibet as a unique and individual culture.

Rangjung Rigpe Dorje, as with all other Karmapas and tulkus, is accepted by Tibetan Buddhists as a manifestation of an enlightened being. Lu Sheng-yen, leader of the Taiwanese new religious movement True Buddha School, claims the 16th Karmapa as one of his early teachers.

Notes

References
 Radiant Compassion--the Life of the 16th Gyalwa Karmapa. Volume One by Gerd Bausch, Edition Karuna 2018.
 Kagyu Life International Volume 3 "A Brief History of the Karma Kagyu Lineage of Tibet" by Topga Yugyal Rinpoche
 Buddhism Today Volume 2 1996 "The Karmapas of Tibet" by Brooke Webb
 Buddhism Today Issue 15 2005 Volume 1 "The Golden kagyu Garland" By Bruce Tawer
 Riding the Tiger by Ole Nydahl
 Entering the Diamond Way by Ole Nydahl

External links

 Biography of the 16th Karmapa on The Treasury of Lives (peer-reviewed)
Biography of the 16th Karmapa at Kagyuoffice.org (Ogyen faction)
 Biography of the 16th Karmapa at Diamondway Buddhism (Thaye faction)

1924 births
1981 deaths
People from Garze
16
20th-century lamas
Kagyu Buddhists
Karma Kagyu lamas